Dalian Development Area is a station on Line 3 of the Dalian Metro in Liaoning Province, China. It is located in the Jinzhou District of Dalian City.

References

Railway stations in Liaoning